Los Ángeles is a corregimiento in Los Santos District, Los Santos Province, Panama with a population of 868 as of 2010. Its population as of 1990 was 780; its population as of 2000 was 878.apellidos conocidos Sáez, Mendieta, Castillo, Osorio

References

Corregimientos of Los Santos Province